Gordon Hudson Dowding (March 1, 1918 – November 9, 2003) was a lawyer and politician in British Columbia, Canada. He represented Burnaby and then Burnaby-Edmonds in the Legislative Assembly of British Columbia from 1956 to 1975 as a CCF/NDP member.

He was born in Kamloops and educated there and at the University of British Columbia. In 1945, he married Gwen Olson. Dowding was called to the British Columbia bar in 1952 and the Alberta bar in 1967. He was an unsuccessful candidate in the provincial riding of Lillooet in 1952 and 1953. Dowding was the speaker of the British Columbia Legislature from 1972 to 1975. He was defeated by Ray Loewen when he ran for reelection in 1975.

In 1962, Dowding was a founding member of the B.C. Civil Liberties Association. He died in 2003.

References 

1918 births
2003 deaths
People from Kamloops
Speakers of the Legislative Assembly of British Columbia
British Columbia Co-operative Commonwealth Federation MLAs
20th-century Canadian politicians
British Columbia New Democratic Party MLAs